This is a listing of Australian rules footballers who made their senior debut for an Australian Football League (AFL) club in 2005.

The statistics refer only to a player's career with the club mentioned.

Debuts

References

Australian rules football records and statistics
Australian rules football-related lists
2005 in Australian rules football